Jens-Kristian Selvejer Sørensen (born 21 March 1987) is a retired Danish professional footballer who played as a defender.

Sørensen grew up in the small village of Biersted, and was nicknamed Farmer as a joke, because Biersted it is so small it almost isn't a village but rather a place. He is known for his physical strength and good heading abilities. He was due to make his first youth international appearance for Denmark, when called up to the Danish u-20 side for the 2006 Milk Cup in Northern Ireland, but an injury forced him to withdraw from the team, making way for AaB teammate Lasse Nielsen.

On 4 October 2006 Sørensen made his senior debut for AaB, when they faced FC Nordsjælland at Farum Park.

Sørensen joined Viborg FF in August 2011.

References

External links

Career statistics at Danmarks Radio

1987 births
Living people
Danish men's footballers
Denmark under-21 international footballers
AaB Fodbold players
Viborg FF players
Vendsyssel FF players
Danish Superliga players
Association football defenders
Association football midfielders
Sportspeople from Aalborg